Roberta Colindrez is a Mexican-American actor and writer known for originating the role of Joan in the musical Fun Home. Colindrez is also known for roles in the TV shows I Love Dick, Vida, and Amazon Prime's A League of Their Own.

Early life
Born in Mexico with Argentinian and Honduran heritage, Colindrez grew up in Houston and Austin in Texas. She first realized she wanted to become an actor at age 12, when she and her brother took a theater class together.  She moved to New York City when starting out as a professional actor.

Career
Colindrez made her off-Broadway debut in 2006, starring in Too Much Light Makes the Baby Go Blind. She appeared in several short films and regional theatre productions after that, and in 2011 she wrote and starred in the film Otis Under Sky. In 2013, she began playing Joan, a "confident young lesbian", in the musical Fun Home off-Broadway. The show closed in early 2014, and after a cameo in the Academy Award-winning film Birdman, Fun Home opened on Broadway in 2015, where it won 5 Tony Awards and was nominated for 7 more. 

Colindrez has also made guest appearances on several television series and her performance on I Love Dick as a butch artist was described as a "breakout" in an interview with Vanity Fair; showrunner Joey Soloway described Colindrez's performance as "masterful", portraying "a queer cowboy masculinity".

In 2019, Colindrez joined the cast of Latino TV drama Vida as a series regular from the second season. She also does voice acting work, most notably in the podcast Alice Isn't Dead.

In 2020, Colindrez joined the cast of Amazon's comedy pilot A League of Their Own.

Colindrez also writes for the stage, preferring "dark, heavy, comedic nuance".

Personal life
Colindrez identifies as queer and butch and nearly passed on Vida because she was worried about being typecast. Prior to Vida, she had faced difficulty establishing her acting career because of her sexuality and gender nonconformity and has spoken about Hollywood being "a place where people who are queer will only be seen as queers". She accepted the role after showrunner Tanya Saracho persuaded her that the character would not be a stereotype.

Colindrez became close friends with Bobbi Salvör Menuez on the set of I Love Dick, which she found helpful when filming a sex scene with Menuez. Menuez gave Colindrez a stick and poke tattoo as a memento of their friendship.

Credits

Film

Television

Theatre
 Water, NPR Playhouse
 The Complete and Condensed Stage Directions of Eugene O'Neill: Vol. 2
 Too Much Light Makes the Baby Go Blind, off-Broadway, 2006
 Song for the Disappeared, Sundance Theatre Lab
 Fun Home, Joan, off-Broadway, Sep. 30, 2013 – Jan. 12, 2014
 Mala Hierba,  Maritza, Second Stage Theatre, 2014
 Fun Home, Joan, Broadway, Apr. 19, 2015 – September, 2016
 Hamlet, Rosencrantz, off-Broadway, 2017

Podcasts 
 Alice Isn't Dead, 6 episodes, 2016–2017
 It Makes a Sound, Pam Orland, 1 episode, 2018

See also
 LGBT culture in New York City
 List of LGBT people from New York City

References

External links

 
 
  (archive)

Living people
Year of birth missing (living people)
Place of birth missing (living people)
American stage actresses
American musical theatre actresses
American television actresses
American people of Argentine descent
American people of Honduran descent
Mexican stage actresses
Mexican musical theatre actresses
Mexican television actresses
Mexican people of Argentine descent
Mexican people of Honduran descent
21st-century American actresses
21st-century American dramatists and playwrights
21st-century American women writers
21st-century Mexican actresses
21st-century Mexican women writers
Queer women
Queer actresses
Mexican LGBT actors
Mexican LGBT writers
American LGBT writers
LGBT Hispanic and Latino American people
Hispanic and Latino American actresses
Hispanic and Latino American dramatists and playwrights